is a Japanese voice actor, singer and lyricist affiliated with Ken Production. He is also the vocalist and lyricist of the Japanese rock band Granrodeo under his stage name Kishow. He is the official Japanese dubbing voice for Fred Jones in the Scooby-Doo franchise.

Filmography

Anime

Drama CDs

Film

Video games

Live-action

Other dubbing

Discography

Granrodeo

 Ride on the Edge (2007)
 Instinct (2008)
 Brush the Scar Lemon (2009)
 Supernova (2011)
 Crack Star Flash (2012)

Stella Quintet (Stella Quintet+)

 Crescendo (single) (2006)
 Stella Quintet Players Side (2007)
 蒼穹のスコア ~The score in blue~ (single) (2009)

Solo
 Daydreamin'  (2005) (Single)
 Warrior (2005) (Single)

References

External links
 Official agency profile at Ken Production 
 

1975 births
Living people
21st-century Japanese singers
21st-century Japanese male singers
Japanese lyricists
Japanese male pop singers
Japanese male rock singers
Japanese male voice actors
Ken Production voice actors
Male voice actors from Yamaguchi Prefecture
Musicians from Yamaguchi Prefecture